The 2013 South Dakota Coyotes football team represented the University of South Dakota in the 2013 NCAA Division I FCS football season. They were led by second year head coach Joe Glenn and played their home games in the DakotaDome. They were a member of the Missouri Valley Football Conference. They finished the season 4–8, 3–5 in MFVC play to finish in a tie for seventh place.

Schedule

Source: Schedule
*Game aired on a tape delayed basis

References

South Dakota
South Dakota Coyotes football seasons
South Dakota Coyotes football